The 21st District of the Iowa Senate is located in southern Iowa, and is currently composed of Polk and Warren Counties.

Current elected officials
Claire Celsi is the senator currently representing the 21st District.

The area of the 21st District contains two Iowa House of Representatives districts:
The 41st District (represented by Jo Oldson)
The 42nd District (represented by Kristin Sunde)

The district is also located in Iowa's 3rd congressional district, which is represented by Cindy Axne.

Past senators
The district has previously been represented by:

Patrick Deluhery, 1983–1992
Maggie Tinsman, 1993–2002
Dennis Black, 2003–2012
Matt McCoy, 2013–2018
Claire Celsi, 2019–present

See also
Iowa General Assembly
Iowa Senate

References

21